Rodolfo Guarnieri (29 October 1927 – 22 September 2019) was an Argentine sports shooter. He competed in the trap event at the 1968 Summer Olympics.

References

External links
 

1927 births
2019 deaths
Argentine male sport shooters
Olympic shooters of Argentina
Shooters at the 1968 Summer Olympics
Sportspeople from Córdoba, Argentina